Johnny Johns (born August 9, 1951) is an American figure skating coach and former competitor. Competing in ice dancing with Mary Campbell, he became the 1973 national champion and finished 6th at the 1973 World Championships. Competing as a pair skater with Melissa Militano, he became a two-time (1974 and 1975) U.S. national champion and finished 6th at the 1975 World Championships.

Personal life 
Johns was born on August 9, 1951. He is from the Detroit area. For a number of years he split his time between skating and Little League Baseball, where he had developed the ability to pitch both left- and right-handed. He attended regular schools during his skating career and studied at the University of Delaware in the early 1970s.

Skating career

Competitive 
Johns began learning to skate as a family activity when he was eight years old. He learned how to do jumps in both directions and also developed a very smooth stroking style.

When his coach left the Detroit area, Johns began to work with Ronald Ludington, who insisted that he give up on baseball and concentrate of skating year-round. Ludington was responsible for pairing him up first with Mary Karen Campbell in dance, and then with Laurie Johnson in pairs.

Johns and Mary Campbell became the 1973 national champions in ice dancing. They competed together at three World Championships, achieving their highest placement, 6th, in 1973.

He and Melissa Militano won the U.S. national pairs' title in 1974 and 1975. They placed 8th at the 1974 World Championships and 6th in 1975.

Post-competitive 
Johns coached at the Detroit Skating Club for 27 years before moving to the Arctic Edge Ice Arena in Canton, Michigan in 2006. He coached Marcy Hinzmann / Aaron Parchem to the Olympics and Danielle Hartsell / Steve Hartsell to a World Junior title. He has also coached Brooke Castile / Ben Okolski and Tessa Virtue / Scott Moir. In January 2019, he relocated to the Hertz Arena in Estero, Florida.

Results

Men's singles

Pairs with Johnson and Benenson

Pairs with Militano

Ice dancing with Campbell

References

 Skatabase: 1970s Pairs
 Skatabase: 1970s Ice dancing

American male pair skaters
American male ice dancers
American figure skating coaches
People from Wayne County, Michigan
Living people
1951 births